Sadeghiyeh (also Sadeghieh, Sadeqiyeh) is a heavily populated district in the West of Tehran, Iran. Also called by its pre-revolutionary name Ariashahr (also Aryashahr) (Persian: آریاشهر), it is one of Tehran's busiest commercial and residential centers. The Sadighiyeh metro station is one of the busiest stations in Tehran where Teheran Metro lines 2 and 5 (Karaj Intercity Train) intersect.

Sadighiyeh has two main squares called First Sadighiyeh Square and Second Sadighiyeh Square.

Neighbourhoods in Tehran